Winchester High School may refer to:

Winchester High School (Illinois) — Winchester, Illinois, United States
Winchester High School (Kentucky), high school for African Americans in Winchester, Kentucky
Winchester High School (Massachusetts) — Winchester, Massachusetts,  United States
Winchester High School for Girls, a former name of The Westgate School, Winchester, Hampshire, United Kingdom